Howard Albert (1911–2004) was a printmaker, musician, and composer. He attended the Art Institute of Chicago in the late 1930s. He also studied printmaking with Stanley William Hayter at Atelier 17 in New York. Hayter's studio was a workshop for other artists such as Picasso and Miró.

In the 1930-1940s, Albert worked for a radio station in Chicago.
Albert founded a printmaking organization called the Pauper's Press where he taught during the 1960s–70s. He was a master of engraving, etching, and woodblock printing. His subjects often included figures, abstraction, typography, and eroticism.
In the 1980s, he moved to Berkeley, California. Albert died in Berkley in 2004.

References

Rob Delamater, "Howard Albert (1911–2004)", The Lost Art Salon, 2010

External links 
 

1911 births
American printmakers
2004 deaths
School of the Art Institute of Chicago alumni
Atelier 17 alumni